Devan Bailey (born 10 May 1989) is a British basketball player.

College career
Devan played two seasons of college basketball at Central Connecticut State, appearing in a total of 61 games, before leaving after his second year in 2011.

Professional career
After having a trial with Italian Seria A giants Victoria Libertas Pesaro in 2011, Bailey signed his first professional contract with British Basketball League team Mersey Tigers. Throughout the 2011–2012 season, he averaged 9.4 points-per-game in 32 appearances. In 2012, he signed for Manchester Giants where he was reunited with Coach Jeff Jones who trained Bailey during his days in the Manchester Magic junior teams. In 30 games for the Giants, Bailey averaged 8.6 points and 3.5 assists. In 2013, Bailey signed for Cheshire Phoenix.

International
Bailey is part of the Great Britain national basketball team, having earned 13 caps. He represented England at the 2012 event of the 3x3 World Championships in Greece.

References

External links
 Eurobasket.com profile

1989 births
Living people
English men's basketball players
Central Connecticut Blue Devils men's basketball players
Cheshire Phoenix players
Mersey Tigers players
English sportspeople of Jamaican descent
Guards (basketball)
People from Rochford
Sportspeople from Essex
English expatriate sportspeople in the United States
British expatriate basketball people in the United States
British expatriate basketball people in France
English expatriate sportspeople in France
Black British sportsmen
English expatriate sportspeople in Portugal
Expatriate basketball people in Portugal